Big Pond (Scottish Gaelic: Am Pòn Mòr) (2001 pop.: 47) is a  community in the Cape Breton Regional Municipality, Nova Scotia, Canada on the south shore of Bras d'Or Lake. Big Pond is approximately in the centre between the communities of St. Peters, Nova Scotia and Sydney, Nova Scotia.

Big Pond is a community that produced award-winning singers Rita MacNeil and Gordie Sampson. Quiet through the winter, with weekends punctuated by church functions, steak darts, potluck suppers, Big Pond plays host to hundreds of visitors and tourists in the summer months.

The community is named after the larger of two ponds (actually enclosed lagoons) on the lake shore: Big Pond and Open Pond. The Mi'kmaq name for the location was "Naooktaboogooik" which roughly translates to "It stands alone".

External links
Big Pond Cape Breton Community Website

Communities in the Cape Breton Regional Municipality